Pen-Link, Ltd., (PenLink) is a software company that develops enterprise-grade communications surveillance data collection and analysis solutions for domestic law enforcement. Their flagship products include PLX and PenPoint. 

One of the more publicized uses of PenLink's products was during the Laci Peterson murder case, where wiretaps taken with Pen-Link 8 and LINCOLN2 were used as evidence against Scott Peterson.

See also
 Lawful interception
 Communications Assistance For Law Enforcement Act

References
https://www.kearneyhub.com/news/local/pen-link-employees-cash-in-on-growing-surveillance-business/article_80216234-5028-5e21-9e8d-6ae6edcbae08.html

Surveillance